The European Tour 2015/2016 – Event 1 (also known as the 2015 Kaspersky Lab Riga Open) was a professional minor-ranking snooker tournament which took place between 29 July and 2 August 2015 at the Arena Riga in Riga, Latvia.

Mark Selby was the defending champion, but he lost 1–4 to Ken Doherty in the Last 32.

Barry Hawkins won the tournament, defeating Tom Ford 4–1 in the final.

Prize fund
The breakdown of prize money of the event is shown below:

Main draw

Preliminary rounds

Round 1
Best of 7 frames

Round 2
Best of 7 frames

Main rounds

Top half

Section 1

Section 2

Section 3

Section 4

Bottom half

Section 5

Section 6

Section 7

Section 8

Finals

Final

Century breaks

 142, 130  Ricky Walden
 140, 132, 108  Graeme Dott
 128, 120  Barry Hawkins
 127, 104  Ali Carter
 127  Tom Ford
 126, 118  Matthew Selt
 124  Matthew Stevens
 123, 105  Alan McManus
 122  Robin Hull
 119, 117, 110  Judd Trump
 119  Mark Selby
 119  Christopher Keogan
 116  Jamie Clarke
 113, 107  Stephen Maguire
 112  Joe Roberts
 111, 104  Andreas Ploner

 109  Liang Wenbo
 108, 104  Joe Perry
 108  Mark Williams
 106  Jimmy White
 105  Ken Doherty
 105  Ryan Day
 105  Joe O'Connor
 102, 100  Ben Woollaston
 102  Craig Steadman
 102  Michael White
 102  Peter Ebdon
 101, 101  Mark Allen
 101  Anthony McGill
 101  Stuart Bingham
 101  Dominic Dale

References

Riga Masters (snooker)
ET1
2015 in Latvian sport